Heart's Desire is a 1917 American drama silent film directed by Francis J. Grandon and written by Shannon Fife and Eve Unsell. The film stars Marie Doro, Alan Roscoe, Mario Majeroni, Jean Del Val, Helen Dahl and Harry Lee. The film was released on April 30, 1917, by Paramount Pictures.

Plot

Cast 
Marie Doro as Fleurette
Alan Roscoe as Paul Le Roque 
Mario Majeroni as Henri Le Roque
Jean Del Val as Jacques 
Helen Dahl as Helen St. Simon
Harry Lee as Le Roque's Secretary
Gertrude Norman as Mother Mathilde
Ida Darling 	
Eddie Sturgis

Preservation status
The film survives and is preserved in the Library of Congress collection. It is entered in their database twice.

References

External links 
 

1917 films
1910s English-language films
Silent American drama films
1917 drama films
Paramount Pictures films
Films directed by Francis J. Grandon
American black-and-white films
American silent feature films
1910s American films